Georges Van Der Poele was a Belgian equestrian and Olympic medalist. He competed in show jumping at the 1900 Summer Olympics in Paris, and won a silver medal in individual show jumping, and a bronze medal in high jump.

References

External links

Year of birth unknown
Year of death unknown
Belgian male equestrians
Olympic equestrians of Belgium
Olympic silver medalists for Belgium
Olympic bronze medalists for Belgium
Equestrians at the 1900 Summer Olympics
Olympic medalists in equestrian
Medalists at the 1900 Summer Olympics